Ballad of Kurbin (original title Balada e Kurbinit) is a 1990 Albanian romantic drama film directed by Kujtim Çashku and written by Vath Koreshi. The film stars Reshat Arbana and Timo Flloko.

Cast
Reshat Arbana
Timo Flloko
Besa Imami
Ndrek Luca
Muhamet Sherri

External links

Albanian-language films
1990 films
1990 romantic drama films
Albanian drama films